Tarachand Barjatya (10 May 1914 – 21 September 1992) was an Indian film producer. He has produced many  Hindi films from the 1960s through to the 1980s. He founded Rajshri Productions which continues to produce films even today. His mainstay was family-oriented films based on family values.

He was born in Kuchaman City in Rajasthan in a Marwari Jain Family in 1914. He studied at Vidyasagar College, Calcutta. He established Rajshri Pictures (P) Ltd. in 1947. Some of the notable films produced by him are Dosti, Jeevan Mrityu, Uphaar, Piya Ka Ghar, Saudagar, Geet Gaata Chal, Tapasya, Chitchor, Dulhan Wahi Jo Piya Man Bhaye, Ankhiyon Ke Jharokhon Se, Sawan Ko Aane Do, Taraana, Nadiya Ke Paar, and Saaransh. He died in 1992. His grandson Sooraj R. Barjatya is a successful film producer and director and his granddaughter is Kavita K. Barjatya.

References

External links 

Tarachand Barjatya Filmography on bmdb.in
Profile of Tarachand Barjatya's Profile on Rajshri Productions' website

1914 births
1992 deaths
Rajasthani people
Film producers from Rajasthan
People from Nagaur district
Vidyasagar College alumni
University of Calcutta alumni
Hindi film producers
20th-century Indian Jains
Marwari people
Barjatya family